The discography of Kathy McCord consists of two studio albums, one compilation album and three singles on CTI Records, Manhattan Records, Rainy Day Records and Big Beat Records.

Albums

Studio albums

Compilation albums

Reissues of the 'Kathy McCord' album

Singles 

 Was released on New Jersey to Woodstock compilation in 2010.

Guest appearances

As part of Crazy Joe & The Variable Speed Band

Albums

Singles 

 Promo single.

Music videos

Production credits

References
General

Kathy McCord > Discography
 
 

Specific

External links

Discographies of American artists